Gallt y Wenallt is a subsidiary summit of Y Lliwedd in Snowdonia National Park, north Wales. It lies at the end of the north ridge. Its northern face is reputed to be the longest slope in Snowdonia, being close to 2000 ft. It is also the last nail in the "completist's"'' Snowdon Horseshoe.

The summit is grassy and is marked with a small cairn. In clear visibility, the view down to Llyn Gwynant is regarded as one of the finest in Snowdonia.

It is the resting place of famous oil man and sailor, Emrys Nye Hughes.

References

External links
 www.geograph.co.uk : photos of Y Lliwedd and surrounding area

Hewitts of Wales
Mountains and hills of Snowdonia
Nuttalls
Mountains and hills of Gwynedd
Beddgelert